The Theban Tomb known as MMA 57 is located in Deir el-Bahari. It forms part of the Theban Necropolis, situated on the west bank of the Nile opposite Luxor. The tomb is likely the burial place of the Ancient Egyptian Harwa.  

The tomb contained large sections of the Book of the Dead of Khamhor (also written as Khaemhor), who dates to the 26th Dynasty. Khamhor was a Prophet of Amon and Mayor of Thebes.

See also 
 List of MMA Tombs

References 

Theban tombs